The Morals of Ruth Halbfass is a 1972 West German drama film directed by Volker Schlöndorff and starring Senta Berger, Peter Ehrlich and Helmut Griem.

Cast

References

Bibliography 
 Hans Bernhard Moeller & George L Lellis. Volker Schlondorff's Cinema: Adaptation, Politics, and the "Movie-Appropriate". SIU Press, 2012.

External links 
 

1972 films
1972 drama films
German drama films
West German films
1970s German-language films
Films directed by Volker Schlöndorff
1970s German films